The NS-Dokumentationszentrum is a museum in the Maxvorstadt area of Munich, Germany, which focuses on the history and consequences of the Nazi regime and the role of Munich as Hauptstadt der Bewegung (′capital of the movement′).

Establishment
In December 2005 the government of Bavaria announced that the museum would be situated at the site of the former Brown House, the Nazi Party headquarters, which played an important role in Munich as "capital of the movement" during the rise of the party and the enforcement of Nazism. The Königsplatz, a square for the Nazi Party's mass rallies, is in sighting distance.

The cornerstone for the building was laid in March 2012. The museum opened to the public in May 2015.

The architectural historian Winfried Nerdinger (de), who helped to establish the centre, has served as its first director since 2012. In October 2017 the museum announced the selection of Mirjam Zadoff to succeed him as director, after his retirement in April 2018. Born in Innsbruck, Austria, Zadoff is a historian and professor of Jewish Studies who holds a doctorate from the Ludwig Maximilian University of Munich; during the 2017-2018 academic year she served as the director of the undergraduate program in Jewish Studies at Indiana University Bloomington.

See also

NS Documentation Centre of the City of Cologne

References

Citations

Bibliography
 

Buildings and structures in Munich
Maxvorstadt
Museums in Munich
World War I museums in Germany
World War II museums in Germany
2015 establishments in Germany
Museums established in 2015